For the results of the Fiji national football team, see:

Fiji national football team results (1951–1999)
Fiji national football team results (2000–present)